Sestrunj is an island in the Croatian part of the Adriatic Sea. It is situated in Zadar Archipelago, between Ugljan, Rivanj and Dugi Otok. The only settlement is also called Sestrunj and is located in the island's interior. The island is partially covered with maquis shrubland and low forests. Remains of an Illyrian fort are situated on the island. The island's main industries are agriculture and fishing.

References

External links 

 Web site about Sestrunj island
 Official web site about Sestrunj island

Islands of Croatia
Islands of the Adriatic Sea
Populated places in Zadar County